The Bowman–Chamberlain House, also known as the Kanab Heritage House Museum, was built in 1894, in Kanab, Utah.  It was listed on the U.S. National Register of Historic Places in 1975.

It was designed by Reuben Broadbent.

 and

References

Houses on the National Register of Historic Places in Utah
Queen Anne architecture in Utah
Houses completed in 1893
Houses in Kane County, Utah
National Register of Historic Places in Kane County, Utah
Buildings and structures in Kanab, Utah